= Eisenhower vs. Stevenson =

Eisenhower vs. Stevenson may refer to one of two United States presidential elections won by Dwight D. Eisenhower against Adlai Stevenson II:

- 1952 United States presidential election, won by Dwight D. Eisenhower against Adlai Stevenson II
- 1956 United States presidential election, won by Dwight D. Eisenhower against Adlai Stevenson II
